The Long Cosmos is a science fiction novel by  Terry Pratchett and Stephen Baxter published on 30 June 2016. It is the final installment in the award-winning five-book parallel-Earth series The Long Earth.

It is the fifth book in the series published posthumously from Terry Pratchett.

Plot
The Long Cosmos further follows the adventures of Joshua Valienté and Lobsang.

References

2016 British novels
Random House books
Cosmos
2016 science fiction novels
Collaborative novels
Novels published posthumously